Deuce is rapper Kurtis Blow's second album, released on June 15, 1981, by Mercury Records. It peaked at number 35 on the R&B charts, and number 137 on the Billboard 200.

Track listing
"Deuce" (Kurtis Blow) – 5:31
"It's Gettin' Hot" (Robert Ford, Jr., J.B. Moore) – 5:28
"Getaway" (Jimmy Bralower, Ford, Jr., Moore, Dean Swenson) – 6:58
"Starlife" (Blow, Moore, Larry Smith, William Whiting) – 5:20
"Take It to the Bridge" – 4:11
"Do the Do" (Blow, Bralower, Seth Glassman, Russell Simmons, Moore) – 3:03
"Rockin'" (Blow, David Reeves) – 4:09

Personnel
Onaje Allen Gumbs: Piano
Robbie Kondor: Synthesizers and electric piano
John Tropea: Guitars
David Reeves, Dean Ballin, Dean Swenson, Hankie Grate: Additional guitars
J.B. Moore: Backing vocals, additional guitars
Seth Glassman: Bass
Jimmy Bralower: Drums, percussion
Jaime Delgado: Timbales, congas
Mark "Sugar Rico" Rivera: Saxophone
Deborah L. Cole, Harold B. Lee, Travis Milner, Wayne Garfield: Backing vocals

References

1981 albums
Kurtis Blow albums
Mercury Records albums